This list of Slovakia international footballers comprises all players to have represented the Slovakia national football team. The team first played in an international match on 27 August 1939, soon after the formation of the first Slovak Republic. The team played some matches during the Second World War, but after this it was subsumed within the Czechoslovakia national team. Slovakia became an independent state again in 1993, following the dissolution of Czechoslovakia. This happened during the 1994 FIFA World Cup qualification, which the Czechoslovakia team completed as a combined team. Slovakia began competing in international football again in 1994, and has since qualified for the 2010 FIFA World Cup.

List of players
Key

References

 
Association football player non-biographical articles